Dalbhanjan Pande or Dalabhanjan Pande was a Nepalese minister, politician and military officer of the aristocratic Pande family. He had held ministerial positions and military offices. He jointly headed the military administration of Nepal in 1837 along with Mukhtiyar Rana Jang Pande.

Life as politician and military officer
Dalbhanjan followed the King Rana Bahadur Shah into exile to Banaras along with Bhimsen Thapa and the Senior Queen Raj Rajeshwari Devi. In July 1804, he along with Badakaji Amar Singh Thapa informed the Company's in-charge Daroga about the orders of takeover of Butwal plains and honor Palpa's former obligations from the King of Gorkha. After 1806, the territories of Palpa were kept under the military governorship of him and Bada Amar Singh Thapa. In 1806, he was deputed to Kangra Fort along with Rudra Vir Shah as senior military officers after the death of Kaji Nain Singh Thapa in the conquest. He was one of the senior Bharadars to have opposed the Anglo-Nepalese War due to prevalence of weak administration in the western front suggesting a possible revolt from the citizens of the newly conquered west. He was among the seniormost officials who reported to Mukhtiyar Bhimsen Thapa from Makwanpur axis along with Ranabir Singh Thapa during the Anglo-Nepalese War. He left for Peking in 1822 leading the seventh Quinquennial mission to China.

Immediately after the incarceration of the Thapas in 1837, a new government with joint Mukhtiyars was formed with Ranganath Paudel as the head of civil administration, and Dalbhanjan Pande and Rana Jang Pande as joint heads of military administration. The ministry formed after the death of Mathabarsingh Thapa included him along with Chautariya Fateh Jung Shah, Gagan Singh Bhandari and Abhiman Singh Rana Magar. He was awarded the rank of General along with the one regiment of soldiers under his administration. He was killed in the Kot Massacre in 1846 by the Kunwar Rana brothers. He was a Kaji officer from at least 1816 to 1838 A.D. making him the leader of Tularam Pande family, then known as Gora (White) Pande faction. Pande died in the Kot massacre on 14 September 1846.

Family

He was the son of Sardar Jagajit Pande of Gora (White) Pande faction belonging to Pande family. He was grandson of Kaji Tularam Pande who died in the Battle of Kathmandu. He had brothers - Janga Bir, Birbhanjan and Singha Bir, all of whom reached the position of Kaji in their lifetime. His uncle Ranajit Pande was once a Mulkaji while the other uncle Bhotu Pande was a military officer in the offence of Sino-Nepalese War.

Gallery

References

Bibliography

Year of birth missing
1846 deaths
Nepalese military personnel
Government ministers of Nepal